Neelima Rani is an Indian actress, a dubbing artist and producer who is mainly known for her roles in Tamil-language soap operas and movies in antagonistic roles.

Career 
Neelima started her career in Oru Pennin Kathai when she was in school. In her summer vacations she also did feature films like Thevar Magan, Virumbugiren and Pandavar Bhoomi. When she was 15 she played the second heroine role in Acham Madam Airyppu  — Brindavanam.  She acted in the 850 episode Sun TV serial, Metti Oli in 2001.

In 2011, she announced that she would place roles on television serials behind her priorities to star in feature films. Her role as Karthi's friend in Naan Mahaan Alla won her Edison Award for Best Supporting Actress, before she went on to portray another pivotal role in Muran.

The actress has turned producer with K. S. Adhiyaman's venture Amali Thumali, a comedy film featuring Nakul, Shanthnu and Santhanam in the lead roles. Her duties as producer meant she had to oversea work in Fiji and thus she had to quit her role in the television serial, Thendral. Later, she played a pivotal role called 'Dimple' in the world record winning Sun TV serial, Vani Rani.

Filmography

Film

Television

Serials

Shows

Other Works

References

External links 
 
 

Indian film actresses
Living people
Actresses in Tamil cinema
Actresses from Chennai
Indian television actresses
Actresses in Telugu television
Actresses in Malayalam cinema
Tamil television actresses
20th-century Indian actresses
21st-century Indian actresses
Indian child actresses
Actresses in Tamil television
Child actresses in Tamil cinema
Actresses in Malayalam television
Year of birth missing (living people)